The following is a list of people born in Serbia or of Serbian nationality who have worked or currently work in the music tradition.

A

B

D

E

F

G

H

I

J

K

L

M

N

O

P

R

S

T

V

Ž

See also
List of Serbian musicians

Serbian
Composers
Serbian composers